USL Breakaways is a sports television series hosted by Gerry Fall airing on the Fox Soccer Channel and sponsored by the United Soccer League (USL).

External links

2006 American television series debuts
2010s American television series
American sports television series